Orzechówka  is a village in the administrative district of Gmina Jasienica Rosielna, within Brzozów County, Subcarpathian Voivodeship, in south-eastern Poland.

Geography

Demographics
The village has a population of 1,550.

References

Villages in Brzozów County